Habib Gock Mekang  (born April 23, 1982 in Cameroon) is a Cameroonian footballer whose last known club was Kyiv amateur side Sokol Mikhailovka-Rubezhovka.

Career
Habib made over 100 Moldovan National Division appearances with FC Nistru Otaci and FC Dacia Chișinău.

After leaving Nistru Otaci in 2012, Habib went on to play for Kyiv based amateur club Bucha until 2012, with a move to Khayr Vahdat FK in the Tajik League occurring in August 2013, where he joined fellow Cameroonian Paul Rolland. Upon returning from Tajikistan, Habib returned to Bucha before moving to fellow Kyiv based amateur club Sokol Mikhailovka-Rubezhovka in 2015.

References

External links
 
 

1982 births
Living people
Association football defenders
Cameroonian footballers
Cameroonian expatriate footballers
Expatriate footballers in Moldova
Cameroonian expatriate sportspeople in Moldova
Tajikistan Higher League players
Moldovan Super Liga players
FC Dacia Chișinău players
FC Nistru Otaci players
FC Akzhayik players
Cameroonian expatriate sportspeople in Ukraine
Cameroonian expatriate sportspeople in Tajikistan
Expatriate footballers in Ukraine
Expatriate footballers in Tajikistan